The m/26 helmet is a  steel helmet that was almost exclusively used by the Swedish Civil Defense, "Civilförsvaret".

A successor to the m/21 steel helmet, the m/26 was of a simplified construction to its predecessor and would be used in secondary roles for years after being formally replaced by the m/37 steel helmet.

Design

Compared to its previous iteration, the M1926 shares the same basic shape but is simplified through the omission of the crest on the top of the shell, the three-crown crest on the front face of the helmet, the rolled edge, and the metal band that attaches the liner to the shell. The liner being the same as on the M1921 but being attached straight to the shell instead of on a separate band.

Sweden would provide Finland with this model helmet as aid during their conflict with the Soviet Union (known as the Winter War). They would also provide Norway with a helmet identical to the M26, called the M31. It would be used during the Norwegian Campaign. The M26 was also delivered to the Norge Police with base in Sweden.

References

External links

Combat helmets of Sweden
Military equipment introduced in the 1920s